Marcelo Bosch (born January 7, 1984) was an Argentine rugby union footballer. He most recently played for Saracens F.C. in the Aviva Premiership. He used to play for the Argentina national team, Los Pumas. His usual position was centre, but he could also play at fly half or full-back.

He participated at the 2011 Rugby World Cup in New Zealand and 2015 Rugby World Cup in England.

Bosch is part of the national squad that competes in the Rugby Championship.

Marcelo Bosch retired from rugby at the end of the 2018/2019 season, his last club being Saracens RFC. During his time at Saracens he has won two Premiership titles in 2016 and 2018. He also helped Saracens win the European Champions Cup in 2016 and 2017.

At the start of the season 2019/2020 season Bosch was a part time player/coach for a level 5 team, Burton RFC in Staffordshire.

References

1984 births
Argentine rugby union players
Biarritz Olympique players
Saracens F.C. players
Living people
Rugby union players from Buenos Aires
Rugby union centres
Rugby union fly-halves
Argentine people of German descent
Expatriate rugby union players in France
Expatriate rugby union players in England
Argentina international rugby union players
Argentine expatriate sportspeople in France
Argentine expatriate sportspeople in England
Argentine expatriate rugby union players
Argentina international rugby sevens players
Male rugby sevens players